Whitefield is the surname of:

 Aaron Whitefield (born 1996), Australian baseball player
 David Whitefield (1936–2014), South African cricketer
 Edwin Whitefield (1816–1892), English-born American landscape painter and lithographer
 George Whitefield (1714–1770), English Anglican cleric and evangelist, one of the founders of Methodism and the evangelical movement
 Henry Whitefield, Archdeacon of Barnstaple from 1371 to 1384
 Karen Whitefield (born 1970), Scottish politician
 Patrick Whitefield (1949–2015), British permaculture teacher, designer and author
 Ruth Althén (1890–1985), Swedish operatic soprano, née Whitefield
 Thomas Whitefield, English politician, mayor of Hereford and Member of Parliament
 William Whitefield (1850–1926), British trade unionist